Che Rashid bin Che Halim (born 17 December 1994) is a Malaysian professional footballer who plays as a right-back for Negeri Sembilan in the Malaysia Super League, on loan from Johor Darul Ta'zim.

Club career
Che Rashid started his career with Johor Darul Ta'zim President's Cup team in 2013. After showing promising performances with youth team, he was loaned to Johor Darul Ta'zim II for 2014 Malaysia Premier League season.

On 2015 season, Che Rashid was promoted to Johor Darul Ta'zim II senior squad. He made 20 appearances during his season debut.

In 2022 he joined the team Negeri Sembilan FC. Has been with the team for one year and has been a key player throughout 2022. He has helped the team secure fourth place in the Malaysia Super League in 2022. It is an impressive achievement as the team has just been promoted from the Malaysia Premier League in the previous year and had shocked the other Malaysia Super League teams because Negeri Sembilan FC was considered an underdog team. He has made 22 appearances during his time with Negeri Sembilan FC .

International career
Che Rashid received his national called up by Harimau Malaya coach, Dollah Salleh for the friendly match against Oman national football team.

He also was called up to the Malaysia U-23 team in preparation for the upcoming tournament in Singapore in June 2015.

International appearances

References

External links
 
 Che Rashid at ifball.com

1994 births
Living people
Malaysian footballers
Malaysia international footballers
People from Johor
Malaysian people of Malay descent
Johor Darul Ta'zim F.C. players
Melaka United F.C. players
Negeri Sembilan FC players
Malaysia Super League players
Association football wingers
Association football forwards